Janjot Singh is an Punjabi film director associated with Rhythm Boyz Production. He started his career assisting the direction for films Jatt James Bond (2014) and Sardaar Ji (2015), and made his direction debut in 2019 with Chal Mera Putt (2019), which became the highest-grossing Punjabi films overseas. Also, the film was nominated for Best Comedy Film, and Singh was nominated for Best Debut Director at PTC Punjabi Film Awards 2020.

Filmography

As director 
 Chal Mera Putt (2019)
 Chal Mera Putt 2 (2020)
  Chal Mera Putt 3 (2021)
 Golak Bugni Bank Te Batua 2 (2022)

As assistant director 
 Jatt James Bond (2014)
 Sardaar Ji (2015)
 Munde Kamaal De (2015)
 Saadey CM Saab (2016)
 Sardaar Ji 2 (2016)
 Sat Shri Akaal England (2017)
 Khido Khundi (2018)

Awards and nominations

PTC Punjabi Film Awards 

 Best Comedy Film - Chal Mera Putt - Nominated
 Best Debut Director- Chal Mera Putt - Nominated

References

External links 
 

Year of birth missing (living people)
Living people
Indian film directors